Gladys Nortey Ashitey (born 21 November 1955) is a Ghanaian Politician and a member of the Fourth Parliament of the Fourth Republic representing the Ledzokuku Constituency in the Greater Accra Region of Ghana.

Early life and education 
Ashitey was born on 21 November 1955 in Ledzokuku in the Greater Accra Region of Ghana on 21 November 1955. She attended the America University of the Caribbean and obtained a Degree in Doctor of Medicine after studying Medicine as a Programme. She also attended the University of Ghana and obtained her Bachelor of Science (Medicine).

Politics 
Ashitey was first elected into Parliament on the Ticket of the New Patriotic Party during the December 2004 Ghanaian General elections as a member of Parliament for the Ledzokuku Constituency in the Greater Accra Region of Ghana. She polled 33,039 votes out of the 76,674 valid votes cast representing 43.10%. She was defeated in 2008 by a National Democratic Congress Candidate Nii Nortey Dua. She served only one term as parliamentarian.

Career 
Ashitey is a physician and a former Member of Parliament for the Lezdokuku Constituency in the Greater Accra Region of Ghana.

Personal life 
Ashitey is a Christian.

References 

21st-century Ghanaian women politicians
Living people
1955 births
University of Ghana alumni
New Patriotic Party politicians
People from Greater Accra Region
Ghanaian MPs 2005–2009
Ghanaian medical doctors